Spaelotis is a genus of moths of the family Noctuidae.

Species
 Spaelotis bicava  Lafontaine, 1998 
 Spaelotis clandestina (Harris, 1841)
 Spaelotis demavendi (Wagner, 1937)
 Spaelotis deplorata (Staudinger, 1896)
 Spaelotis dominans (Corti & Draudt, 1933)
 Spaelotis havilae (Grote, 1880)
 Spaelotis lucens Butler, 1881
 Spaelotis nyctophasma Hacker, 1990
 Spaelotis quadricava  Lafontaine, 1998 
 Spaelotis ravida ([Schiffermüller], 1775)
 Spaelotis restricta Boursin, 1968
 Spaelotis scotopsis Boursin, 1963
 Spaelotis senna (Freyer, 1829)
 Spaelotis sennina Boursin, 1955
 Spaelotis sinophysa Boursin, 1955
 Spaelotis solida (Erschoff, 1874)
 Spaelotis stoetzneri (Corti, 1928)
 Spaelotis suecica (Aurivillius, 1891)
 Spaelotis unicava  Lafontaine, 1998 
 Spaelotis valida (Walker, 1865)
 Spaelotis velicava  Lafontaine, 1998

References
Natural History Museum Lepidoptera genus database
Spaelotis at funet

Noctuinae